The following is a list of Sites of Special Scientific Interest in the South East Sutherland Area of Search.  For North West Sutherland see List of SSSIs in North West Sutherland.  For SSSIs elsewhere in Scotland, see List of SSSIs by Area of Search.

 Alladale Pinewood
 Amat Woods
 Badanloch Bogs
 Ballinreach Coastal Gorges
 Beinn Dearg
 Ben Griams
 Ben Klibreck
 Ben More Assynt
 Carrol Rock
 Cnoc an Alaskie
 Coir' an Eoin
 Creag na Croiche
 Dornoch Firth
 Dunrobin Coast
 Garbh Allt
 Grudie Peatlands
 Helmsdale Coast
 Inverbrora
 Knockfin Heights
 Kyle of Sutherland Marshes
 Lairg and Strathbrora Lochs
 Ledmore Wood
 Loch Awe and Loch Ailsh
 Loch Fleet
 Lon A'Chuil
 Loth Gorge
 Migdale Rock
 Mound Alderwoods
 Oykel Gorge
 Rhidorroch Woods
 Skinsdale Peatlands
 Spinningdale Bog
 Strath an Loin
 Strath Carnaig and Strath Fleet Moors
 Strath Duchally
 Strathfleet
 Torboll Woods

 
South East Sutherland